The Copenhagen Democracy Summit is an international conference taking place every summer in Copenhagen, Denmark, organised by the Alliance of Democracies. The summit brings together political and business leaders, including current and former heads of government, from the world's democracies. In parallel, a similar conference takes place every winter in Denver, Colorado, United States.

In light of a decline of liberal democracies across the world, the aim of the summit is to be a top international forum for analysis on the security and economic challenges facing the democratic world as well as a forum for analysis on the interplay between technology and democratic norms.

The inaugural Copenhagen Democracy Summit took place in Copenhagen on 22 July 2018. Among those who attended were the former Canadian prime minister Stephen Harper, the US former vice-president Joe Biden, the former British prime minister Tony Blair, the former Estonian president Toomas Ilves and the then incumbent Danish prime minister Lars Løkke Rasmussen. A total of 350 participants attended from over 40 countries. One of the publications released at the conference concluded that people's trust in government is lower in democracies than in non-democratic states.

References

2018 establishments in Denmark
Annual events in Copenhagen
International conferences
Democracy